Canmore Nordic Centre Provincial Park  is a provincial park in Alberta, Canada, located immediately west of Canmore,  west of Calgary.

It is part of Kananaskis Country's park system.

1988 Olympics 
The Canmore Nordic Centre was originally constructed for the 1988 Winter Olympics. The cross-country skiing, biathlon and cross-country skiing part of the Nordic combined events were held there.

1991 Winter Deaflympics 
The centre also hosted the giant slalom and slalom events for the Banff 1991 Winter Deaflympics, in the Olympic tracks area.

Amenities 
The Canmore Nordic Centre provides trails for use by cross-country skiers, mountain bikers, and hikers. The park also features a disc golf course.

The centre was re-developed for the 2005 Cross-country World Cup and future international events.  The Nordic Centre hosts national training camps for Canada's biathlon and cross-country ski teams, in addition to providing winter and summer recreational facilities to the general public.

See also 
 List of provincial parks in Alberta
 List of Canadian provincial parks
 List of National Parks of Canada

References

Further reading

External links
 
 

Venues of the 1988 Winter Olympics
Olympic biathlon venues
Olympic cross-country skiing venues
Olympic Nordic combined venues
Provincial parks of Alberta
Parks in the Canadian Rockies
Kananaskis Improvement District
Ski areas and resorts in Alberta
Canmore, Alberta
Ski stadiums in Canada